Robinsons Summit Center, formerly known as the JG Summit Center, is an office skyscraper located in Makati, Philippines. It is owned by JG Summit Holdings, Inc., and developed by its real estate arm, Robinsons Land Corporation.

Design
The Robinsons Summit Center was designed and masterplanned by the international architectural firm Hellmuth, Obata + Kassabaum (HOK), in cooperation with Filipino architectural firm W.V. Coscolluela & Associates. The building's structural frame was designed by R.S. Caparros Associates & Company. The building boasts of an unobstructed view of the Makati skyline from all floors. It has a double-height main lobby and double-height glass wall frontage, and a three-zone vertical movement configuration for optimum elevator performance. A rooftop master antenna, while providing great potential for the building's communication systems, also serves as an architectural highlight to the entire building.

Location

Strategically situated along Ayala Avenue near the corner of Paseo de Roxas, The Robinsons Summit Center is accessible and near every other major destination in Makati. Around its area are the Glorietta Mall, Greenbelt, and Ayala Center, educational institutions like the Asian Institute of Management, the Ateneo Graduate School of Business, and the Ateneo Law School.  It is also a few blocks away from deluxe hotels like Makati Shangri-La, The Peninsula Manila, Dusit Thani Manila plus the service facilities of the Makati Medical Center and the Central Post Office.

It is selected as a base of major call centers and a telecommunications company.

Amenities
The building is designed to comprise only 6 units per floor with an average floor plate of only . On the 8th and 9th floors is a branch of Fitness First health club, which is also open to non-tenants. In the 37th floor is the Philippine operations of Hewlett-Packard Philippines Corporation. The building also has a helipad located on its roof deck, 10-level parking with over 390 slots, and is equipped with a state-of-the-art building management and communications system.

See also
 List of tallest buildings in Metro Manila

References

External links
 Robinsons Summit Center at Emporis
 JG Summit Center at Skyscraperpage.com
 Robinsons Summit Center at Ayala Map

Buildings and structures in Makati
Skyscrapers in Makati
Skyscraper office buildings in Metro Manila
Office buildings completed in 2001
HOK (firm) buildings